Patrick Parisot (born 23 February 1947) is a French bobsledder. He competed in the two-man and the four man events at the 1972 Winter Olympics.

References

1947 births
Living people
French male bobsledders
Olympic bobsledders of France
Bobsledders at the 1972 Winter Olympics
Place of birth missing (living people)